National Academy of Legal Sciences of Ukraine is a highest-level science institution in Ukraine, since 1993. Before 1993 the academy was a public organization.

The main tasks of the academy are:
 comprehensive development of legal science, conducting fundamental and applied research in the field of state and law;
 scientific support of law-making activity of state bodies, study and generalization of the mechanisms of implementation of legislative acts;
 determination of priority directions for the development of the rule of law, scientific support for the implemented reforms, preparation of practical recommendations for improving the activities of state authorities;
 promotion of dissemination of legal information, formation of legal awareness of citizens, development of legal education in Ukraine;
 generalization of the world experience of legal regulation of social relations;
 integration of academic, university and industry legal science with the aim of developing a unified policy in this area;
 support of talented scientists, promotion of scientific creativity of young people in the field of law.

History
At the end of 1991, a group of scientists and practitioners took the initiative to create the All-Ukrainian public association "Academy of Legal Sciences of Ukraine". On March 4, 1992, the founding conference of the Academy was held in the premises of the  National Law Academy of Ukraine in Kharkiv; the rector of the National Law Academy, Vasyl Yakovych Tatsii, became its first president. The process of creating the Academy of Legal Sciences of Ukraine as a public organization ended with the official registration of its Charter by the Ministry of Justice of Ukraine on March 31, 1992.

The Academy of Legal Sciences of Ukraine was founded as a higher-level scientific institution "... based on the need for the comprehensive development of legal science and the creation of scientific foundations for the development of Ukrainian statehood...", in accordance with Decree #275/93 by the President of Ukraine, "On the Academy of Legal Sciences of Ukraine", dated July 23, 1993.

"... In order to promote the further comprehensive development of legal science, increase the effectiveness of scientific research in the field of political science and law, and scientific support for law-making activities of state authorities in the process of transformation of the political system of society, consolidation of leading scientific schools, maximum effective use of the creative potential of employees of scientific institutions and professorships - teaching staff of higher educational institutions of a legal profile from different regions of Ukraine", in accordance with Decree #80/2009 by the President of Ukraine, "Issues of the Academy of Legal Sciences of Ukraine", dated February 10, 2009, four regional centers were created within the structure of the Academy: Eastern (Kharkiv), Western (Lviv), Southern (Odesa), Central (Kyiv, on the basis of the active Kyiv regional center of the Academy), and the new location of the governing bodies of the Academy was determined - Kyiv.

"Taking into account the leading role of the Academy of Legal Sciences of Ukraine in ensuring the comprehensive development of legal science, conducting fundamental and applied scientific research in the field of the state and law, a significant contribution to the training of scientific personnel", February 23, 2010, according to Decree #233/2010 of the President of Ukraine, "About grant of national status to the Academy of Legal Sciences of Ukraine", the academy was granted the status of "national", and hereinafter referred to as the National Academy of Legal Sciences of Ukraine.

The printed organ of the National Academy of Legal Sciences of Ukraine is "Journal of the Academy of Legal Sciences of Ukraine".

Structure
The academy has the following departments:
 Theories and history of the state and law;
 State and legal sciences and international law;
 Civil and legal sciences;
 Environmental, economic and agrarian law;
 Criminal and legal sciences.

In accordance with Decree #80/2009 by the President of Ukraine, "Issues of the Academy of Legal Sciences of Ukraine", dated February 10, 2009, a department of problems of state formation and constitutional law was established in the structure of the academy.

The academy includes the following institutions and organizations:
 Academician V. V. Stashis Research Institute for the Study of Crime Problems (Kharkov);
 Pravo Publishing House ;
 Research Institute of State Construction and Local Self-Government (Kharkov);
 Research Institute of Intellectual Property (Kyiv);
 Research Institute of Informatics and Law (Kyiv);
 Research Institute of Private Law and Entrepreneurship named after academician F. G. Burchak (Kyiv);
 Research Institute of Legal Support of Innovative Development (Kharkov).

References

External links
Official website
 This article at Ukrainian Wikipedia
 This article at Russian Wikipedia

Scientific organizations based in Ukraine
Scientific organizations established in 1993
1993 establishments in Ukraine
Culture in Kyiv
Institutions with the title of National in Ukraine